Ilemodes isogyna is a moth of the family Erebidae. It is found in the Democratic Republic of Congo, Malawi, Tanzania and Zimbabwe.

References

 Natural History Museum Lepidoptera generic names catalog

Arctiini
Moths described in 1935
Erebid moths of Africa